Victims of this Fallen World is the third album by the Canadian death metal band Kataklysm. It is the first Kataklysm album to feature Maurizio Iacono as frontman and lead vocalist. The album was eventually re-recorded in 2005.

Track listing

Personnel
 Maurizio Iacono – Vocals
 Stephane Barbe – Bass
 Jean-François Dagenais – Guitar, record producer
 Max Duhamel – drums

External links
 Kataklysm - official website
 Nuclear Blast - official website
  Myspace - official website

1998 albums
Kataklysm albums